Hannu Pekka Toivonen (born 18 May 1984) is a Finnish former professional ice hockey goaltender. Current goaltending coach for the Toronto Marlies. He played with the Boston Bruins and the St. Louis Blues in the National Hockey League (NHL), the former of which drafted him 29th overall in the 2002 NHL Entry Draft. Toivonen also spent several years with the Tampereen Ilves of the Liiga in his home country.

Although Toivonen was widely considered to be a top goaltending prospect, he was injured in 2005–06 and never regained the form that made him a first-round selection in 2002.

Playing career

Professional
Toivonen started his pro career with HPK in the Finnish SM-liiga. He was drafted by the Boston Bruins of the National Hockey League (NHL) in the 2002 NHL Entry Draft, and moved to the Providence Bruins of the American Hockey League (AHL) in 2003.

With Andrew Raycroft sitting out due to a contract dispute, Toivonen started the 2005–06 NHL season as the Bruins' backup goaltender. He made his NHL debut on 8 October 2005 against the Pittsburgh Penguins, coming away with an overtime win. He holds the distinction of allowing the first goal of Sidney Crosby's career in that game. On 1 December 2005, he recorded his first NHL shutout, blanking the Ottawa Senators. Toivonen was 9–5–4 with a 2.63 GAA and a .914 SV% before suffering a high ankle sprain in January that effectively ended his season.

At the beginning of the 2006–07 season, Toivonen and Tim Thomas were competing for the starter spot. After a rough start at the beginning of the season, Toivonen was sent down to Providence and was replaced by Brian Finley on 7 November 2006, officially making Thomas the starting goaltender for Boston. Over the course of the next couple months, he was repeatedly recalled to Boston and sent back down to Providence. On 2 April, he was recalled to Boston for the last two away games, then sent back to Providence on 6 April. On 26 April 2007, Toivonen signed a one-year contract extension with the Bruins.

On 23 July 2007, Toivonen was traded to the St. Louis Blues in exchange for Carl Söderberg. Upon being traded to the Blues, Toivonen was reunited with former Bruins teammates Brad Boyes, Ryan Glenn, Yan Stastny and Derek Gustafson. In the 2007–08 season, Toivonen played in 23 games with the Blues before he was assigned to the Peoria Rivermen, the Blues' AHL affiliate, on 11 February 2008.

Toivonen spent the 2008–09 season with Ilves in Finland, but re-signed with St. Louis on 9 June 2009. He was then assigned to the Blues' farm team in Peoria on 21 September 2009, for the beginning of the 2009–10 season. On 1 March 2010, Toivonen was traded from St. Louis to the Chicago Blackhawks, along with Danny Richmond, in exchange for goaltender Joe Fallon. All players involved in the trade remained with their respective AHL affiliates.

Toivonen signed a two-year contract with the Malmö Redhawks of the HockeyAllsvenskan on 1 July 2011. In the 2011–12 season he played in 19 games, averaging a .895 save percentage (SVS) and 3.30 goals against average (GAA). However, due to economical crisis in the Redhawks club, Toivonen was forced to leave the club after the 2011–12 season. His contract is being paid out by the Redhawks.

With the commencement of the 2013–14 season under-way, Toivonen joined the Toledo Walleye of the ECHL on 11 November 2013.

On 11 April 2014, Toivonen returned to Finland to sign a contract with newly promoted Liiga club, Vaasan Sport.

Career statistics

Regular season and playoffs

International

References

External links 

1984 births
Boston Bruins draft picks
Boston Bruins players
Finnish ice hockey goaltenders
Graz 99ers players
HIFK (ice hockey) players
HPK players
Ilves players
Iowa Wild players
Living people
Maine Mariners (ECHL) players
Malmö Redhawks players
Milwaukee Admirals players
National Hockey League first-round draft picks
Orlando Solar Bears (ECHL) players
People from Hämeenlinna
Peoria Rivermen (AHL) players
Providence Bruins players
Rockford IceHogs (AHL) players
St. Louis Blues players
SaiPa players
Toledo Walleye players
Sportspeople from Kanta-Häme